The first BRDC International Trophy meeting, formally titled the Daily Express International Trophy, was held on 20 August 1949 at the Silverstone Circuit, England. It was the first race meeting to only use the former airfield's perimeter roadways, rather than the main runways. The event was held over two heats of 20 laps and one final of 30 laps of the Grand Prix circuit. The final was won by Italian Alberto Ascari, who would go on to win the World Championship of Drivers twice. In addition to the main Formula One-regulation competition, the meeting also contained events for 500 cc racing cars and production cars. The race meeting was attended by over 100,000 people, but was marred by the death of St. John Horsfall in an accident on the 13th lap of the final race.

Results

Final

Heats

References

Citations

Other sources
Results and other data drawn from:

BRDC International Trophy
BRDC International Trophy
BRDC International Trophy
BRDC International Trophy
BRDC International Trophy